Tall Chegah or Tal Chegah or Tol Chegah, also rendered as Tal Cheka and Tal Cheqa, may refer to:
 Tall Chegah-e Olya, Khuzestan Province
 Tall Chegah-e Sofla, Khuzestan Province
 Tal-e Chegah, Kohgiluyeh and Boyer-Ahmad
 Tal-e Chegah, Basht, Kohgiluyeh and Boyer-Ahmad Province